Eric Douglas Harvey Hoyle, Baron Hoyle JP (born 17 February 1930) is a British politician and life peer who was chair of the Parliamentary Labour Party from 1992 to 1997 and a lord-in-waiting from 1997 to 1999. A member of the Labour Party, he was Member of Parliament (MP) for Nelson and Colne from 1974 to 1979 and Warrington North from 1981 to 1997.

Parliamentary career

House of Commons
Hoyle first stood for Parliament at Clitheroe in 1964, but came second. In 1970, he first fought Nelson and Colne, and was defeated by the Conservative incumbent David Waddington by 1,410 votes. He fought the seat again in February 1974, and reduced Waddington's margin to 177. He was finally elected at the general election of October 1974 for Nelson and Colne by 669 votes; this was the first Labour gain to be announced on election night.

Hoyle narrowly lost his seat at the general election of 1979, but returned to Parliament in 1981 when he saw off a strong challenge from Roy Jenkins in a traditionally safe Labour seat. This was a notable by election in Warrington when enthusiasm for the newly created Social Democratic Party was at its peak. Constituency boundaries were redrawn for the general election of 1983, when he became MP for Warrington North.

House of Lords
Hoyle stepped down from the House of Commons at the general election of 1997, and on 14 May 1997, he was created a life peer as Baron Hoyle, of Warrington in the County of Cheshire.

Other interests
Lord Hoyle served as chairman of Warrington Wolves Rugby League Club from 1999 to 2009. He has also been a non executive director of the major local employer Debt Free Direct. Already having received the Freedom of Gibraltar in 2004, he was awarded the Gibraltar Medallion of Honour, in March 2010, for being a 'supporter of Gibraltar and its people'.

Hoyle received the Freedom of the Borough of Warrington on 11 November 2005.

In November 2010, Lord Hoyle was awarded an honorary Doctor of Letters degree by the University of Chester for his 'outstanding contribution to the Borough of Warrington'.

Family
Hoyle's son, Sir Lindsay Hoyle, has been Member of Parliament for Chorley since 1997, Deputy Speaker of the House of Commons from 2010 to 2019 and Speaker of the House of Commons since 2019.

References

External links
 
 Profile, parliament.uk. Accessed 24 January 2023.

English justices of the peace
1930 births
Living people
Labour Party (UK) MPs for English constituencies
Labour Party (UK) life peers
Labour Party (UK) Baronesses- and Lords-in-Waiting
UK MPs 1974–1979
UK MPs 1979–1983
UK MPs 1983–1987
UK MPs 1987–1992
UK MPs 1992–1997
Warrington Wolves
Politics of Warrington
Politicians from Lancashire
Life peers created by Elizabeth II